Yukina Sakabe is a Japanese professional footballer who plays as a defender for WE League club Tokyo Verdy Beleza. She made her WE League debut on 10 October 2021.

References 

Japanese women's footballers
Living people
Nippon TV Tokyo Verdy Beleza players
Women's association football defenders
WE League players
Year of birth missing (living people)